William Ketchum (March 2, 1798 – October 1, 1876) was the 14th Mayor of the City of Buffalo, New York. He served from 1844 to 1845.

Biography
William Ketchum was born on March 2, 1798, in Bloomfield, New York. He moved to Buffalo in 1819, and became a partner at a merchant house that handled furs and hats.  He was one of the founders of the original Bank of Buffalo along with Major Andre Andrews and Hiram Pratt.

Ketchum served as a Buffalo Village Trustee prior to the city's incorporation, and later served on the Erie County Board of Supervisors. On March 5, 1844, he ran successfully as the Whig candidate for mayor. He did not run for re-election in 1845.  He was later a Republican and a Hindoo, a splinter group of the Republican Party. 

In 1847, he patented the first practical lawn mower in the US.
  In 1851 he was appointed Collector of the Port of Buffalo by President Millard Fillmore. He retired from the fur and hat business in 1857. In 1861, he patented the Ketchum Grenade, which was used by the Union Army during the American Civil War.

Later in life, he developed an interest in the History of Buffalo, New York, and wrote a two-volume history of early Buffalo.

Personal life
On March 18, 1823, he married Lamira Callendar of Buffalo; she died in 1866 and he remarried on September 7, 1871, to Elizabeth Palmer of Brantford, Ontario.  He died October 1, 1876, and is buried in the Ketchum family plot in Forest Lawn Cemetery.

Electoral history

See also
List of mayors of Buffalo, New York
Ketchum Grenade

References

1798 births
1876 deaths
Mayors of Buffalo, New York
Burials at Forest Lawn Cemetery (Buffalo)
New York (state) Whigs
19th-century American politicians
Collectors of the Port of Buffalo